"You Can Make It If You Try" is a song written by Ted Jarrett and recorded by Gene Allison in 1957. In 1958, Allison's recording peaked at No. 3 on the U.S. Black Singles, and at No. 36 or at No. 37 (sources differ) on the U.S. Pop Singles, Billboard charts.

The song has been covered by other artists, including The Rolling Stones (on their 1964 self-titled debut album), Gene Vincent (on his 1971 album The Day the World Turned Blue) and Buddy Guy (on his 1980 album Breaking Out ). 
 
In 1969, Sly and the Family Stone included a funk version of the song with different lyrics on the album Stand!. That version (which is credited to Sylvester "Sly Stone" Stewart) has been both covered and sampled by other artists.

References 

1957 songs
Songs written by Ted Jarrett
Gene Allison songs
The Rolling Stones songs
Sly and the Family Stone songs